O'Shaquie Dominique Williams Foster (born 17 September 1993) is an American professional boxer, who has held the WBC super featherweight title since February 2023.

Professional boxing career

Early career

Career beginnings
Foster made his professional debut against Theo Johnson on 8 September 2012. He won the fight by a first-round technical knockout. Foster amassed a 10–0 record during the next four years, before making his first step-up in competition. That step-up came against the undefeated Lavisas Williams on 19 February 2016, on the undercard of Showtime's "ShoBox: The Next Generation". Foster won the fight by a seventh-round technical knockout. He dropped Williams in rounds two, three, four and seven. Foster next faced Rolando Chinea on 22 July 2016. Chinea handed Foster his second professional loss, as he won the fight by split decision.

Foster bounced back from his second professional loss with a first-round technical knockout of Andrew Goodrich on 29 December 2017 and a majority decision win against Kaylyn Alfred on 20 January 2018, with both fights taking place at lightweight. Foster returned to super featherweight to face Frank De Alba on 13 April 2018. He won the eight round bout by majority decision. Two judges scored the fight 79–73 and 78–74 in his favor, while the third judge scored it as an even 76–76 draw.

WBC Silver super featherweight champion
Foster was booked to face the unbeaten WBC Silver super featherweight champion Jon Fernandez, in the main event of the "ShoBox: The New Generation" series, which took place on 21 September 2018. He won the fight by unanimous decision, with all three judges scoring the fight 98–92 in his favor. Foster landed 145 total punches and 96 power punches over ten rounds, while Fernandez managed to land 102 total punches and 89 power punches.

Foster faced Fatiou Fassinou in a stay-busy fight on 23 February 2019. It was Foster's first fight near his native Orange County, as it took place in Beaumont, Texas. He won the fight by a third-round retirement, as Fassinou opted to remain in his corner after the third round ended. Foster was scheduled to fight Jesus Bravo for the vacant WBA Fedecentro super featherweight title on 17 July 2019, at the Gimnasio Nacional Eddy Cortés in San Juan, Puerto Rico. It was Foster's first fight outside of the United States. He won the fight by an eight-round knockout. Foster floored Bravo with a counter right straight at the 2:59 minute mark of the eight round, which prompted referee Ronald Alvarez to stop the fight with one second remaining in the round.

Foster made his first WBC Silver title defense against Alberto Mercado on 5 December 2019, at the Terminal 5 in New York City. The fight was scheduled for the undercard of the UFC Fight Pass broadcast super lightweight title fight between Ana Laura Esteche and Mary McGee. He won the fight by unanimous decision. Two judges scored the fight 99–91 in his favor, while the third judge scored it 98–92 for Foster.

Foster made his second WBC Silver title defense against the veteran Miguel Roman on 19 November 2020, after an eleven-month absence from the sport. The fight was scheduled as the main event of an NBCSN broadcast card, which took place at the Wild Card Boxing in Los Angeles, California. Some minor controversy occurred prior to the fight, as it was discovered by Foster's head coach Bobby Benton that the padding was removed from Roman's gloves. The state commission confiscated the gloves, and replaced them by a second pair. Foster won the fight by a ninth-round knockout, forcing a referee stoppage with a flurry of punches at the 0:58 minute mark. Roman was knocked down twice prior to the stoppage. Foster first knocked him down with a right straight midway through the opening round, while the second knockdown was the result of a left hand early in the ninth round.

Foster is scheduled to face the #2 ranked WBC super featherweight contender Muhammadkhuja Yaqubov in a WBC title eliminator on 18 March 2022, on the undercard of the Estelle Yoka Mossely and Yanina del Carmen Lescano IBO title bout. He won the fight by unanimous decision, with scores of 118–109, 117–110 and 117–110. Foster scored the only knockdown of the fight in the twelfth round, dropping Yaqubov with a left overhand.

WBC super featherweight champion

Foster vs. Vargas
Foster was booked to face the reigning WBC featherweight champion Rey Vargas for the vacant WBC super featherweight title, on 11 February 2023, at the Alamodome in San Antonio, Texas. The sanctioning body permitted Vargas to challenge for the vacant championship, while holding a belt a weight class lower, following the breakdown of his negotiations with the WBA featherweight titleholder Leo Santa Cruz. Despite entering the bout as a slight underdog, Foster was able to win the fight by unanimous decision, with scores of 116–112, 117–111 and 119–109. Foster landed 144 total and 87 power punches throughout the twelve round contest, compared to the 101 total and 66 power punches from Vargas.

First title defense
During the annual WBC convention, held on November 9, 2022, the sanctioning body ordered the winner of the vacant championship bout between Foster and Rey Vargas to make two mandatory title defenses: first against the once-defeated Eduardo Hernandez and the second against the winner of the Muhammadkhuja Yaqubov and Robson Conceição title eliminator.

Professional boxing record

See also
List of world super-featherweight boxing champions

References

External links

 

|-

1993 births
Living people
American male boxers
African-American boxers
People from Orange, Texas
Boxers from Texas
Super-featherweight boxers
Lightweight boxers
World super-featherweight boxing champions
World Boxing Council champions